Geraldo is a Spanish, Italian or Portuguese name equivalent to Gerald or Harold. It may refer to:

Notable individuals 
Geraldo, English bandleader (1904–1974)
Geraldo Alckmin, Brazilian politician
Geraldo Alves (footballer, born 1980), Portuguese 
 Geraldo Cleofas Dias Alves, Brazilian international footballer
Geraldo Boldewijn, American football player
 Geraldo Gonzalez, Cuban boxer known as Kid Gavilán
Geraldo Guzman, baseball player
Geraldo Majella Agnelo, Brazilian priest
Geraldo Moreira da Silva Júnior, Brazilian football player
Geraldo de Proença Sigaud, Brazilian priest
Geraldo Rivera, American television personality, host on the Geraldo talk show
Geraldo Rocha Pereira, Brazilian footballer
Geraldo dos Santos Júnior, Brazilian football player
Leonardo de Jesus Geraldo, Brazilian footballer

Fictional characters
Geraldo Russo, a.k.a. Jerry Russo, a character from Wizards of Waverly Place

Nickname
Hermenegildo da Costa Paulo Bartolomeu, Angolan footballer

See also
Giraldo
Heraldo
Gerardo